Justin Wiggill (born 22 June 1975) is a South African cricketer. He played in three first-class matches for Boland from 1995/96 to 1997/98.

See also
 List of Boland representative cricketers

References

External links
 

1975 births
Living people
South African cricketers
Boland cricketers
Cricketers from East London, Eastern Cape